Uusimaa is a region of Finland.

Uusimaa may also refer to:

Places
 Uusimaa (constituency), an electoral district of Finland
 Uusimaa (historical province), a traditional linguistic-cultural provincial region, and defunct historical province of Sweden in present-day Finland
 Uusimaa and Häme County (Nyland and Tavastehus County), a former county of Sweden
 Uusimaa Province, a former province of Finland
 Eastern Uusimaa, a former region of Finland

Ships
 Finnish gunboat Uusimaa, during World War II
 Finnish frigate Uusimaa, in Finnish Navy service 1964–1980
 FNS Uusimaa, a Hämeenmaa-class minelayer, built in 2007

Other uses
 Uusimaa (newspaper), a daily newspaper

See also 

 Nyland (disambiguation) (Swedish for Uusimaa)
 Häme
 Udema, a type of warship built for the Swedish archipelago fleet 
 Southern Finland